Acastocephala is a genus of trilobite from the middle Silurian, known from the United Kingdom.

Etymology 
The name is derived from the genus Acaste and the Ancient Greek κεφαλή (kephalē) "head", indicating the headshield is similar to Acaste.

Taxonomy 
Acastocephala may contain the ancestor of Acastava.

Distribution 
 A. macrops occurs in the Middle Silurian of the United Kingdom (Wenlock Shale, Malvern, Worcestershire; Wenlock Limestone, Pen-y-Lan, Cardiff, and Dudley and Ludlow, Ledbury, Hereford).
 A. dudleyensis has been found in the Middle Silurian of the United Kingdom (Wenlock Limestone, Wren's Nest, Dudley, Worcestershire).

References

External links
 Wenlock Trilobite Acastocephala - Fossilmuseum.net

Acastidae
Silurian trilobites of Europe
Fossils of Great Britain
Fossils of England
Fossils of Wales